The Coppa Città di Offida-Trofeo Beato Bernardo is a one-day cycling race held annually in Italy. It is part of UCI Europe Tour in category 1.2U. It was held as a junior race from 2007 to 2009.

Winners

References

Cycle races in Italy
UCI Europe Tour races